Moreland Township is one of nineteen current townships in Pope County, Arkansas, USA. As of the 2010 census, the unincorporated population was 699.

Geography

Cities, towns, villages
Moreland
Oak Grove

References
 United States Census Bureau 2008 TIGER/Line Shapefiles
 United States Board on Geographic Names (GNIS)
 United States National Atlas

External links
 US-Counties.com
 City-Data.com

Townships in Pope County, Arkansas
Populated places established in 1844
Townships in Arkansas